Calypso in Brass is an album by Harry Belafonte, released by RCA Victor (LPM-3658 and LSP-3658) in 1966. The album contains new arrangements
of previously recorded songs, notably from Calypso and Belafonte Sings of the Caribbean, with a brass ensemble accompaniment.  The orchestra was conducted by Howard A. Roberts and arranged by Bob Freedman.

Track listing
"Jump in the Line" (Raymond Bell) – 4:17
"Jump and Bray Medley (Hold 'em Joe and The Jack-Ass Song)" (Hugh Thomas/Irving Burgie, William Attaway) – 4:30
"Cocoanut Woman" (Harry Belafonte, Lord Burgess) – 3:17
"Tongue Tie Baby" (William Eaton) – 4:07
""Zombie Jamboree (Back to Back)" (Conrad Eugene Mauge, Jr.) – 3:14
"Sweetheart from Venezuela" (Bob Gordon, Fitzroy Alexander) – 3:57
"Man Smart, Woman Smarter" (Norman Span) – 4:49
 "Reincarnation" (Irving Burgie, Theophilus Philip) – 3:20
"Judy Drownded" (Lord Burgess) – 3:07 
 "The Naughty Little Flea" (Norman Thomas) – 3:34
"Mama Look a Boo-Boo" (Lord Melody) – 3:07

Personnel
Harry Belafonte – vocals
Orchestra conducted by Howard A. Roberts
Production notes:
Bob Freedman – arrangements
William Eaton – producer
Phil Ramone – producer
William Attaway – liner notes

References

1966 albums
Harry Belafonte albums
Albums produced by Phil Ramone
RCA Victor albums
Albums conducted by Howard Roberts